Armored Core 4 is a 2006 vehicular combat game developed by FromSoftware. It is the 12th installment and 4th main installment in the mecha-based Armored Core series, the game serves as a reboot for the franchise. It was released for the PlayStation 3 and Xbox 360 in Japan in 2006 and worldwide the following year.

Armored Core 4 is set in the future where a war has made the nations of Earth devastated and these respective governments have been replaced by corporations. Conflicts soon begin to break out between the corporations, that use massive combat robots, Armored Cores, to fight each other. The player is a Lynx, a name given to pilots of highly advanced NEXT Armored Cores.

Armored Core 4 streamlines many of the features of previous entries while retaining these highly complex customization system. Players are given missions from various clients in return for credits, which they can spend on unlockable parts and weapons. In addition to system link and split-screen multiplayer, players can engage in online battles with up to seven other players. Armored Core 4 is also notable for being the directorial debut of Hidetaka Miyazaki.

Gameplay 
Like previous entries in the franchise, in Armored Core 4 players pilot mech units called Armored Cores and take on missions in return for credits. An arena mechanic returns to allow players to fight in 1-on-1 matches against computer-controlled opponents. When starting a new game, players choose from one of several Armored Cores with differing difficulty ratings. A tutorial introduces the basic game concepts prior to beginning the story sections. Once players finish the tutorial, they can begin selecting missions and earning credits for customization.

Gameplay has been sped up and controls have been streamlined to be more accessible than previous entries. Customization, a franchise staple, has retained depth. Hundreds of available parts and weapons can be used to radically change the player's mech, and each part has a number of stats to detail effectiveness. A change from earlier titles is that many parts are not available during beginning of this game and instead are unlocked in groups as the game progresses in throughout story. Parts can also be tuned to subtly alter performances to fit a player's needs.

While system link and split-screen options return, Armored Core 4 is the first entry outside of Japan to have online multiplayer, since the mode's sole implementation in the Japanese version of Armored Core 2: Another Age. Players on the PlayStation Network or Xbox Live can play with up to 7 additional players in various deathmatch modes. On the Xbox 360, Armored Core 4 introduced achievements to the franchise.

Plot
This game is set in a dystopian version of Earth, where corporations have conquered the world's governing bodies amidst increasing civil unrest and dwindling resources, and established a new world order named the Pax Economica, forcing citizens to live in oppressively ruled colonies. Eventually, the member corporations of the Pax Economica begin warring with one another. They begin hiring pilots, known as Lynxes, to fight on their behalf.

The player character and main character is a freelancer from the civilian colony of Anatolia that is soon chosen to pilot a NEXT which is a highly advanced Armored Core unit, and is assigned Fiona Jarnefeldt as his operator. Initially, the player is hired to counter rebel attacks, culminating in an attack on an anti-establishment group. Amazigh, the group's Lynx, is killed in the battle, garnering significant fame for the player. With this new fame, the player is hired to fight in minor skirmishes between corporations, which escalates until they are hired by Global Armaments to destroy a series of prototypes  developed by a seceding company. The mission is successful, but another corporation, Akva Vit, declares war on Global Armaments because of Akva Vit's ties with the seceding company.

During this war, the player makes contact with a friend of Fiona, Joshua O'Brian, who is also a Lynx pilot. The player successfully destroys one of the biggest corporations by assassinating the company's leadership, but an unknown corporation suddenly attacks Anatolia in retaliation. After eliminating this weapon, Fiona questions who ordered this attack. As the war continues, the player and Joshua independently destroy two other major corporations, including Akva Vit, which ends the war.

After the war, Joshua is blackmailed into piloting a prototype NEXT and is sent to destroy Anatolia. The player is forced to kill him, leading the player and Fiona to leave Anatolia.

Release 

Armored Core 4 was initially released in Japan for the Sony PlayStation 3 on December 21, 2006. FromSoftware partnered with Sega and released a North American version for the PlayStation 3 and Xbox 360 on March 20, 2007, followed by a Japanese release on the Xbox 360 few days later. In Europe, FromSoftware partnered with 505 Games and released the game for the PlayStation 3 and Xbox 360 on June 22, 2007.

Reception

Armored Core 4 received "mixed or average" reviews on both platforms according to the review aggregator website Metacritic. In Japan, Famitsu gave the PlayStation 3 version a score of 31 out of 40, while Famitsu Xbox 360 gave the Xbox 360 version a score of 32 out of 40.

Reviewers found that Armored Core 4's graphical update was a welcome addition following its increasingly outdated visuals over the last several titles, but noted that there were still issues with the visual presentation of the game. Gamespot's Tom Magrino wrote that after years of "pining for a graphical update" that the "update has now arrived", though he had reservations about the blandness of certain environments and clipping issues with mechs on hilly terrain. Andrew Mellick from 411Mania remarked that the graphics looked impressive "sometimes" and noted that while the game had sections that "really look breathtaking", the game's "level of inspiration didn’t keep up the whole game". IGN's Greg Miller was far less impressed by the updated visuals, writing that "what they had didn't work". Bryan Vore of Game Informer opened his review by stating the "biggest surprises" found in Armored Core 4 is the multiplatform status of the title and the "next-gen graphical makeover".

Changes to the core systems were praised by reviewers, with Eurogamer's Dave McCarthy calling it "more accessible than its predecessors". Gamespot's Magrino described the game as a "more visceral experience" and wrote that the streamlined boost mechanics allowed for greater freedom of movement. He praised the faster gameplay and commented that mech customization felt streamlined compared to previous entries, while still offering a considerable amount of depth for those who decided to dig deeper. Conversely, GamePro was unimpressed with the game's mechanics, writing that the missions were too repetitive and frequently broken up by loading screens and that the game was "far more complicated than it needed to be". Game Informer's Vore felt that mech customization was still as inaccessible as it had been previously, writing: "Do we really need to worry about four separate booster classes?"

While the addition of online multiplayer was welcomed, reviewers noted that there wasn't much variety in its offerings. While GameSpot's Magrino acknowledged that online multiplayer was a "much-anticipated feature", he believed that the limited map and game type selection "doesn't offer much to get excited about". Game Informer's Vore agreed, adding that the lack of respawn mechanics severely limited the playtime in multiplayer matches. IGN's Miller was more critical of the map selection, calling them "inadequate arenas".

References

External links
  
Armored Core 4 at FromSoftware
 

2006 video games
505 Games games
Armored Core
PlayStation 3 games
Sega video games
Xbox 360 games
Video games about mecha
Third-person shooters
Multiplayer and single-player video games
Fiction about corporate warfare
Video games directed by Hidetaka Miyazaki
Video games scored by Kota Hoshino
Video games developed in Japan